The canton of Bourgoin-Jallieu is an administrative division of the Isère department, eastern France. It was created at the French canton reorganisation which came into effect in March 2015. Its seat is in Bourgoin-Jallieu.

It consists of the following communes:
 
Bourgoin-Jallieu
Châteauvilain
Domarin
Eclose-Badinières
Les Éparres
Meyrié
Nivolas-Vermelle
Ruy-Montceau
Saint-Chef
Saint-Marcel-Bel-Accueil
Saint-Savin
Salagnon
Sérézin-de-la-Tour
Succieu

References

Cantons of Isère